Kerry Joel Lynch (born July 31, 1957 in Denver, Colorado) is an American former nordic combined skier who competed from 1979 to 1987. He is best known for his doping scandal at the 1987 FIS Nordic World Ski Championships in Oberstdorf, West Germany in which he and his coach Jim Page approved a plan to give Lynch an illegal transfusion to increase his red blood cell count. Lynch would finish second in the 15 km individual event behind Norway's Torbjørn Løkken, only to be stripped of his medal when he and Page confessed to the scandal. Lynch would serve a two-year suspension as a result and was prohibited from participating in the 1988 Winter Olympics. He is the only Nordic combined athlete to ever been stripped of a medal either in the Winter Olympics or in the FIS Nordic World Ski Championships. The United States would not win a Nordic combined medal at the Nordic skiing World Championships until Johnny Spillane's gold medal in the 7.5 km sprint event at Val di Fiemme in 2003.

Despite his doping controversy Lynch competed in two Winter Olympics, earning his best finish of 13th at Sarajevo in 1984. He would also become only the second American to win anything at the Holmenkollen ski festival when he won the Nordic combined event in 1983, fifteen years after John Bower won the same event. Lynch's only other World Cup victory also took place in 1983 in a 15 km individual event in Austria.

He also was three-time national champion in the Nordic combined event (1981, 1983, 1986).

References

 Christine Aschwaden's September 10, 2000 Washington Post story on sports doping that included Lynch's scandal.
 
 Holmenkollen winners since 1892 - click Vinnere for downloadable pdf file 
 Olympic nordic combined individual results: 1968-84
 Review of the 1987 FIS Nordic World Ski Championships for the 2005 event.
 Sports-reference.com profile
 US Nordic combined national champions: 1932-2007

1957 births
American male Nordic combined skiers
Nordic combined skiers at the 1980 Winter Olympics
Nordic combined skiers at the 1984 Winter Olympics
Doping cases in Nordic combined
Holmenkollen Ski Festival winners
Living people
Skiers from Denver